Caroline Leavitt is an American novelist. She is the New York Times bestselling author  of Is This Tomorrow and Pictures of You, as well as 8 other novels, including Cruel Beautiful World and With or Without You..

Leavitt is the recipient of a New York Foundation for the Arts Award in Fiction, and a Goldenberg Fiction Prize. She was also a National Magazine Award Nominee in Personal Essay, a finalist in the Nickelodeon Screenwriting Awards and a finalist in the Sundance Screenwriters Lab. A book critic for The Boston Globe, The San Francisco Chronicle and People, she has also published in New York Magazine, Psychology Today, More, Redbook, Parenting, and more. Cruel Beautiful World was named one of the Best Books of the Year by BlogCritics and by The Pulpwood Queens. Pictures of You was named one of the Best Books of the year by the San Francisco Chronicle, The Providence Journal, Bookmarks, and one of the top five books by Kirkus Reviews. Is This Tomorrow was named one of the Best Books of the Year by January magazine, and was long-listed for the Maine Prize, as well as being a Jewish Book Council BookClub Pick. She lives in Hoboken, New Jersey with the music journalist and author Jeff Tamarkin and has a grown actor/writer son.

Bibliography 
 With or Without You
 Cruel Beautiful World
 Is This Tomorrow
 Pictures of You
 Girls In Trouble
 Coming Back To Me
 Living Other Lives
 Into Thin Air
 Family
 Jealousies
 Lifelines
 Meeting Rozzy Halfway
 The Wrong Sister

References

External links 
 Author's website

Living people
People from Waltham, Massachusetts
Writers from Hoboken, New Jersey
Novelists from Massachusetts
American women novelists
20th-century American novelists
20th-century American women writers
21st-century American novelists
21st-century American women writers
Novelists from New Jersey
Year of birth missing (living people)